Sir Robert Wallace Best, KCMG (18 June 185627 March 1946) was an Australian lawyer and politician who served in both the Senate and the House of Representatives. He was a Senator for Victoria from 1901 to 1910, and then represented the Division of Kooyong in the House of Representatives from 1910 to 1922. Best served in cabinet in the second and third governments of Alfred Deakin. Before entering federal politics, he also served in the Victorian Legislative Assembly from 1889 to 1901, where he was a government minister.

Early life
Born in the Melbourne suburb of Collingwood to (Northern) Irish immigrants, and raised in Kyneton, Best was educated at Templeton's School, Fitzroy.  He left school at 13 and became a clerk in a printing office and then worked for a solicitor where he took articles and matriculated in 1875.  He studied law at the University of Melbourne and was admitted as a solicitor in 1881.  He married Jane Langridge the same year.  He was elected as an alderman on Fitzroy City Council almost continuously from 1883 to 1897 and served as mayor in 1888 and 1889.

Political career
In April 1889, Best was elected to the Victorian Legislative Assembly as the member for Fitzroy (later subsumed by the seat of Richmond) and was offered, but turned down, a position in William Shiels' ministry in 1892.  From September 1894 to December 1899 he was President of the Board of Land and Works, Commissioner of Crown Lands and Survey, and Commissioner of Trade and Customs.  He was responsible for introducing tariff reform in 1896 and land reform in 1898 to promote closer settlement and acted twice as Premier.

Best was a strong supporter of the federation of Australia and resigned from the Legislative Assembly and was elected to the Australian Senate in the 1901 election. He was the inaugural Chairman of Committees in the Senate, serving from 1901 to 1903. He was Vice-President of the Executive Council and Leader of the Government in the Senate from February 1907 until November 1908 in the third Deakin Ministry, where he was responsible for tariff and excise bills. Best was appointed Knight Commander of the Order of St Michael and St George in 1908. He served as Minister for Trade and Customs in Alfred Deakin's Fusion ministry from June 1909 to April 1910.  He lost his seat in the landslide to Labor at the 1910 election, but was soon returned to Parliament at a by-election for the House of Representatives seat of Kooyong.  He supported the introduction of conscription and he became a Nationalist in 1917.  At the 1922 election, he was beaten narrowly on Labor preferences by John Latham, who ran as an independent on the slogan, "Get Rid of Hughes".

Later life

Best returned full-time to his legal practice, which he had never abandoned.  After the death of his first wife in 1901, he married Maude Evelyn Crocker-Smith.  He died in 1946 in the Melbourne suburb of Hawthorn survived by two sons and two daughters of his first marriage and four daughters of his second. His second daughter Phyllis Best was an actress who toured with Dame Sybil Thorndike and married fellow actor and radio personality Atholl Fleming.  His third daughter, Helene Best, was a pianist who trained at the Melbourne Conservatory. She went to London in 1935. A son, Arthur Best, played for Melbourne and St Kilda in the Victorian Football League.

Notes

 

1856 births
1946 deaths
Members of the Cabinet of Australia
Protectionist Party members of the Parliament of Australia
Commonwealth Liberal Party members of the Parliament of Australia
Nationalist Party of Australia members of the Parliament of Australia
Members of the Australian Senate for Victoria
Members of the Australian Senate
Members of the Australian House of Representatives for Kooyong
Members of the Australian House of Representatives
Members of the Victorian Legislative Assembly
Australian Knights Commander of the Order of St Michael and St George
Australian politicians awarded knighthoods
20th-century Australian politicians
People from Fitzroy, Victoria
Australian people of Northern Ireland descent
Politicians from Melbourne